In enzymology, a sulochrin oxidase [(+)-bisdechlorogeodin-forming] is an enzyme that catalyzes the chemical reaction

2 sulochrin + O2  2 (+)-bisdechlorogeodin + 2 H2O

Thus, the two substrates of this enzyme are sulochrin and O2, whereas its two products are (+)-bisdechlorogeodin and H2O.

This enzyme belongs to the family of oxidoreductases, specifically those acting on X-H and Y-H to form an X-Y bond with oxygen as acceptor.  The systematic name of this enzyme class is sulochrin:oxygen oxidoreductase (cyclizing, (+)-specific). This enzyme is also called sulochrin oxidase.

References

 

EC 1.21.3
Enzymes of unknown structure